Stéphane Roda (born 16 June 1973 in Cagnes-sur-Mer, France) is a French former professional football midfielder.

During his career Roda played for Aurillac, Metz, Gueugnon, Strasbourg, Angers, Le Havre and Fréjus.

Roda played in the 2000 Coupe de la Ligue Final and helped Gueugnon win the 1999–2000 Coupe de la Ligue.

Honours
Gueugnon
 Coupe de la Ligue: 2000

References

External links

Living people
1973 births
Association football midfielders
French footballers
Le Havre AC players
FC Metz players
FC Gueugnon players
RC Strasbourg Alsace players
Angers SCO players
ÉFC Fréjus Saint-Raphaël players
FC Aurillac Arpajon Cantal Auvergne players